František Čermák and Leoš Friedl were the defending champions, but chose not to participate that year.

Christopher Kas and Philipp Kohlschreiber won in the final 6–3, 6–4, against Michael Berrer and Mischa Zverev.

Seeds

Draw

Draw

External links
 Draw

Stuttgart Open Doubles
Doubles 2008